Behind the Yellow Line (in Chinese 緣份), also known as Fate, is a 1984 Hong Kong romantic comedy film directed by Taylor Wong and starring Leslie Cheung, Maggie Cheung, and Anita Mui. The film was released in Hong Kong on 3 October 1984.

Plot
Paul (Leslie Cheung) meets Monica (Maggie Cheung) on the metro who he takes an immediate attraction to. Together, the two fend off Paul's obsessive suitor and Monica's toxic ex.

Cast
 Leslie Cheung as Paul Chan
 Maggie Cheung as Monica 
 Anita Mui as Anita
 Anthony Chan as  Ng Wai
 Chan Lap-ban as Rubbish lady
 Lawrence Cheng as Cafe captain
 Connie Mak as DJ Mak Kit-man
 Alfred Cheung as Alfred Cheung 
 Sze Kai-keung as Ng Wai's brother
 Yip Ha-lei as Paul's father
 Cheng Mang-ha as Paul's mother
 Michael Mak as Anita's boyfriend in MRT
 Michael Tong as Ben
 Tang Kei-chan as Building security guard
 Eric Yeung as Job interviewer
 Tang Wai-si
 Kwan Kam-ming
 Chang To-mei as Monica's studio colleague
 Nick Lam as Fat customer in cafe
 Tsui Oi-sam as Fat customer in cafe
 Titus Ho as Man in blue suit at bus stop
 Chin Tsi-ang as Granny in MRT
 Tai Wan-wai

Release
The film was released in Hong Kong on 3 October 1984. It was released in mainland China on March 25, 2016.

Reception

Box office
The film grossed HK$8,755,898 at the Hong Kong box office during its theatrical run from 3 to 18 October 1984. On its opening weekend in mainland China, the film grossed .

Accolades

References

External links 
 
 

1984 films
1984 romantic comedy films
Hong Kong romantic comedy films
1980s Cantonese-language films
Shaw Brothers Studio films
Films set in Hong Kong
Films shot in Hong Kong
Films directed by Taylor Wong
1980s Hong Kong films